David Gibson Black (29 March 1868 – 1940) was a Scottish international footballer who scored in the 1896 FA Cup Final for Wolverhampton Wanderers. He also played for both Tottenham Hotspur and Arsenal.

Career
Black was playing for local club Hurlford when he was capped by the Scottish national team in 1889. He played and scored in a 7–0 victory over Ireland at Ibrox on 9 March.

He moved south to Middlesbrough, then of the Northern League, before joining Wolverhampton Wanderers in 1893, making his Football League on 2 September 1893 in a 7-1 loss at Nottingham Forest.

He featured regularly for Wolves between 1893–96, and appeared in the 1896 FA Cup Final for them. He netted an equaliser during the final but ultimately had to settle for a runners-up medal as Sheffield Wednesday won the game 2–1.

After 84 appearances and 17 goals (in total) for the Midlanders, he moved to Burnley in 1896. His stay at Turf Moor was extremely brief though and he soon left for Tottenham Hotspur. 

He spent just one full season with Spurs. At the beginning of the season he made his Southern League debut away against Sheppey United in a 3–3 draw. He played and scored in both of Tottenham's FA Cup games in that season.

Black joined Woolwich Arsenal in May 1898. However, he did not play for Arsenal at any level.

After leaving Arsenal Black returned to Scotland to play for Clyde where he stayed for two years before retiring from the game.

He died in 1940.

References

Bibliography
 
 
 

1868 births
1940 deaths
Footballers from Irvine, North Ayrshire
Scottish footballers
Scotland international footballers
English Football League players
Middlesbrough F.C. players
Wolverhampton Wanderers F.C. players
Burnley F.C. players
Tottenham Hotspur F.C. players
Arsenal F.C. players
Clyde F.C. players
Association football wingers
Grimsby Town F.C. players
Date of death missing
Place of death missing
FA Cup Final players